Thailand's official national lottery is administered by The Government Lottery Office (GLO). The lottery is drawn on the first and the sixteenth of every month. It is one of only two forms of legalised gambling permitted in Thailand, the other being horse racing in Bangkok.

The lottery in Thailand is hugely popular despite the low odds of winning and the unfavourable payout ratio. The payout ratio for the Thai lottery is 60%, as compared with world-wide averages of 74% for bingo, 81% for horse racing, 89% for slot machines, and 98% in blackjack (basic rules). It is the most popular legal form of gambling in Thailand.

Around 19.2 of 67 million Thais played the government lottery, spending 76 billion baht (US$2.3 billion) in 2014, according to the Family Network Foundation's Secretary Wanchai Boonpracha. Unlike in most countries, where the government licenses and monitors the lottery business, the Thai GLO itself prints and sells the tickets to wholesalers. The strict laws that forbid other gambling activities results in the GLO pocketing 28% of lottery profits for state use.

GLO charter
As the government lottery is a public concern and is a source of state revenue, it was made a state enterprise with a legal identity. The Government Lottery Office Act B.E. 2517 was enacted on 11 September 1974, and became effective on 1 October 1974.

History
Lottery tickets were first issued in the reign (1868–1910) of King Rama V. At that time the king granted the Royal Bodyguard permission to operate a lottery on the occasion of his birthday in 1874. Lotteries were then held intermittently until 1933 when they became a standard government revenue source. Over the years the price of lottery ticket has climbed from one baht to its present official price of 80 baht, although that price has been seldom observed, a surcharge invariably being added.

The military government that took power in May 2014 has made lottery reform one of its priorities. Starting 16 June 2015, the military government has mandated that the price of a lottery ticket will not exceed 80 baht. Starting 1 August 2015, what is commonly called the "jackpot" or bonus first prize of 22 or 30 million baht will be eliminated.

Demographics
In Thailand, women play the lottery more than men by a small margin (52.6 against 47.4%). Lottery gamblers tended to be drawn from working age brackets: 21–30 years (28.2%), 31–40 years (30.2%), and 41–50 years (21.8%). Almost two-thirds of lottery gamblers in Thailand (61.3%) were in low income bracket, earning almost a quarter less than the average monthly salary.

Economics
Until October 2015, from the GLO printing press to the ticket consumer, Thai government lottery tickets were bought and sold in a multi-tiered market. The GLO sold lottery tickets to national wholesalers, commonly referred to as "brokers". Brokers then sold on to the nation's 14,760 registered retail vendors who in turn sold to the public.

In September 2015 the government announced a new paradigm for the sale of lottery tickets. Lottery vendors will be able to buy lottery tickets directly from GLO under a scheme to reduce the high price of lottery tickets. Direct purchase is available only through Krung Thai Bank. Vendors must first register with the GLO and must open bank accounts for payment of their purchases. The new arrangement will go into effect with the 16 October 2015 drawing. Vendors are allowed to purchase from 5–50 books at the price of 70.40 baht for a pair of tickets. Each book includes 100 ticket pairs. It is not clear how this will reduce the price of lottery tickets as under the old scheme vendors paid the same price (70.40 baht) to ticket wholesalers. The new scheme will increase the number of lottery tickets for sale by 7–8 million.

For decades, the Thai public blamed brokers, the so-called "five tigers" (as tigers only "eat and sleep"), for monopolizing the lottery trade and for causing overpricing problems. The GLO, doing nothing to dispel this myth, maintained that five groups controlled the distribution of lottery tickets to local vendors throughout the country. However, in late-2014 ThaiPublica used the freedom of information act to force the GLO to divulge information about ticket allocation. The results show that the Thai public was misled about the existence of the "five tigers" in that there are many more than five, and that the biggest tiger of all is the GLO Foundation, a purpose-made mechanism designed to oversee the allocation of money to charities.

As of 25 December 2014, of the 74 million lottery tickets printed for the bi-weekly lottery, 22.74 million or 30.7% of them were allotted to 10 organisations. The GLO Foundation is the biggest recipient, having a fixed quota of 9,213,500 tickets. Other fixed ticket quotas as of that date were:
Association of Retired GLO Employees: 2,129,800 tickets
GLO Co-op Store: 298,100
Government Lottery Vendor's Association (Disabled): 664,700
Disabled Lottery Vendor's Association (Thailand): 513,400
War Veteran's Association: 2,350,000
Police and Families Welfare Foundation: 500,000
National Council on Welfare of Thailand: 1,353,900
To provinces via provincial governors: 28,000,000
Misc foundations, organizations, associations, legal entities: 22,000,000

In May 2015 the GLO board adjusted the lottery price structure under which 60% of the revenue earned by the GLO is allocated for prize money. The revenue sent by the GLO to the treasury will be cut from 23% to 20% with the difference go to the GLO as management fees. Three percent will be allocated to set up a fund for social activities, 2% as a discount for foundations, associations, and organizations, and 12% as a discount for retailers or lottery vendors.

Under this new arrangement, retail agents will receive a quota of five books of lottery tickets (one book contains 100 tickets) at a cost of 70.40 baht per lottery ticket. Foundations, associations, and organisations will retain their quotas at the cost price of 68.80 baht per ticket.

Maj Gen Apirat Kongsompong, chairman of the GLO board. said that, under this new pricing, retailers will make a profit of 9.60 baht per ticket and they will make 10,000 baht profit each month from two fortnightly draws. He has said that selling lottery tickets "...is not a job,..." and should be treated as supplementary career. Vendors should find a second job to make extra earnings."If they have to find something to do in their village, they should...be a farmer."

Several Thai governments, including the present one, have proclaimed their intent to supplement the existing distribution system with automated lottery ticket machines. The proposal is contentious, opposed by, among others, moralists who contend that it would corrupt Thai children. Wanchai Ariyabuddhiphongs, a management professor at Bangkok University who studies the gambling issue, questions whether the machines would corrupt Thai children given how prevalent gambling already is. "Thai people are Buddhists, which means they're supposed to observe the five precepts," said Wanchai, including abstaining from alcohol and sexual misconduct. "But they drink a lot, gamble, frequent brothels. Come to Bangkok, there are massage parlors all over, which are brothels in disguise. I don't really buy the moral argument here."

Play

Buying a lottery ticket
Lottery tickets are sold to national wholesalers who then sell them on to local retailers. Tickets are available only from retail agents. Lottery vendors can be found roaming markets, streets, and villages carrying their signature slim wooden ticket briefcases. There are also lottery ticket stands outside shops such as Tesco Lotus and Big C. Lottery tickets come in "ticket pairs". The official cost of a single ticket is 40 baht, but lottery tickets can only be purchased in ticket pairs, making the official retail price 80 baht. 

In practice, the official price is almost always marked up. Street vendors might ask 120-130 baht for a ticket pair. At stands outside shops, 100 baht is a common price. Prices can vary by ticket pair. Unpopular numbers are cheaper—85, 90, or 95 baht—while lucky Buddhist number combinations cost more. As is often the case in Thailand, lottery ticket prices above the 80 baht threshold are negotiable.

Since last summer's lottery reforms, it has been illegal to inflate ticker-pair prices above the 80 baht threshold. Though marked-up prices from street vendors are still commonplace, the ongoing crackdown has created significant difficulties to ticket sellers.

Lottery tickets
There are two types of Thai lottery tickets. The first is the Thai Government Lottery (TGL) ticket. The second is the Thai Charity Lottery (TCL) ticket. These titles are printed at the upper left of each ticket. Aside from the names, the two differ only in their first prize payouts and the amount of tax to be paid on winnings. TGL tickets have a first prize of six million baht, a bonus prize of 30 million*, and are taxed at 0.5%. TCL tickets have a first prize of three million baht, a bonus prize of 22 million*, and are taxed at 1%.
Bonus prize eliminated by the military government after 1 Aug 2015.

Thai lottery tickets, whether TGL or TCL, are pre-printed, include a number of anti-counterfeiting features, and can only be purchased in "ticket-pairs". Each individual ticket is priced at 80 baht, and the ticket pair at 160 baht. Single tickets are not sold, only ticket pairs.

Each ticket in a ticket-pair is identical except for:
The pictograms (centre of each ticket)
Bar codes (lower right)
Unit numbers (2-digit numbers, lower centre. In the examples shown, "09" and "10", and "81", "82"). A "unit" consists of one million 40 baht tickets. Published prize amounts are honoured if the unit sells out. If it does not, prizes are reduced proportionately.

On the verso of each ticket is the schedule of prizes, ancillary information, and conditions.

Draw methodology (simplified)
Ten "guests" unaffiliated with the lottery attend each drawing to act as official witnesses. Drawings are held at GLO headquarters on the first and sixteenth of every month. Should either of these dates fall on a holiday, the draw is postponed to the next day. All drawings are televised from 15:00 to 16:00 on the day of the draw. The following procedure is followed:

 One of the guests is named "Draw Chairman".
 Guests inspect the equipment, numbers of balls, and search for anomalies.
 Draw Chairman randomly selects balls (numbers) to initialize each draw machine.
 Draw Chairman randomly selects a colored ball to determine the order of lesser prize draws. Four colored balls signify different prizes: yellow for 2nd prize, pink for 3rd prize, green for 4th prize, and blue for 5th prize.
 Six-digit numbers are drawn for the 2nd, 3rd, 4th, and 5th prizes. Total draws 165.
 Three-digit numbers are drawn for the 3-digit prize. Total draws four.
 A two-digit number is drawn for the 2-digit prize. Total draws: one.
 A six-digit number is drawn for the first prize. Total draws: one. Also announced are the ±1 special prize numbers.
 Draw a two-digit number for the Thai Government Lottery bonus prize of 30 million baht*.
 Draw a two-digit number for the Thai Charity Lottery bonus prize of 22 million baht*.
 Following the last three draws, officials remove balls from machines to show that all 10 numbers were present.

Bonus prize eliminated by the military government after 1 Aug 2015.

Prizes
The first prize for all six correct numbers is 2 million baht (TGL) or 3 million baht (TCL) per ticket. As tickets are sold in pairs, the published prize amount is doubled. Doubling applies to all prizes except for the 22 million and 30 million baht bonus prizes. There are five-second prizes of 100,000 baht, ten third prizes of 40,000, fifty prizes of 20,000 for fourth, one hundred 10,000 baht prizes for fifth and a 50,000 baht consolation prize for the six-digit winning number plus or minus one.

Lottery drawings on the first and sixteenth of each month are televised on National Broadcasting Services of Thailand and Spring News starting at 14:30 on Spring News and 15:00 on NBT also simulcast on Radio Thailand Domestic Service. in 2016 the draw also simulcasted on Thairath TV starting from 14:00. Towards the end of the show, just before 16:00, the winning numbers are displayed. Results are posted on The Government Lottery Office website.

Claiming a prize
Prizes must be claimed within two years of the draw date. Prizes of less than 20,000 baht are paid in cash by a lottery retail vendor. A one or two percent commission is deducted from gross winnings. For prizes of more than 20,000 baht, the winning ticket and its holder must be present in person at the government lottery office in Nonthaburi where a cheque will be issued. All winnings are subject to tax: 0.50% on the Thai Government Lottery and 1% on the Thai Charity Lottery.

Distribution of revenues
According to the act creating the GLO, the proceeds received by the Government Lottery Office from the sale of lottery tickets shall be allocated as follows:
 
60% as prizes.
not less than 28% as state revenue.
not exceeding 12% as expenditure on administration inclusive cost of sales: 9% for cost of sales and 3% for administrative costs.

Charities supported
The lottery generates four billion baht a year for the Thai Red Cross, charities, community projects, and scholarships, and keeps many people, often disabled, employed as ticket sellers.

GLO international affiliations
The GLO is a member of the World Lottery Association (WLA) and of the Asia Pacific Lottery Association (APLA).

Underground lotteries
Underground lottery or huaytaidin dealers around the country operate lotteries estimated at four to five times the size of the official lottery, according to Associate Professor Dr. Sungsidh Piriyarangsan, Dean of the College of Social Innovation RSU. Underground lotteries are based on numbers drawn in the official lottery. These dealers offer better prizes, credit purchases, and more betting options. As a small underground lottery business can be started with just a notebook and a pen, they are ubiquitous, and an effective crackdown is impossible.

So prevalent are Thai underground lotteries, they flourish even in Thai expatriate communities abroad.

Underground lotteries, illegal but tolerated, are played by nearly one-third of a population. The lottery is such an important part of Thai life that the country's leading university, Chulalongkorn, has a researcher devoted to studying it. A survey published in 2011 by the researcher, Noppanant Wannathepsakul, found that 20 million people played the underground lottery in Thailand, out of a population of 65 million. Underground lotteries are more popular than the official lottery partly because the chances of winning are better, at one in 100. The main official prize is much larger, but its odds are one in one million. The unofficial lottery is part of the vast Thai underground economy, beyond the reach of the tax authorities and not counted in official economic statistics. It is also a rich source of petty corruption. Mr Noppanant estimates that the police get 11 billion baht, or US$362 million, in bribes and protection money from the underground lottery every year.

Superstitions
The Thai search for winning lottery numbers is insatiable and bewildering to outsiders. Thais often pick numbers derived from news events or oddities they observe: the number of bananas on a stalk or the appearance of a two-headed fish, cats with strange markings, or the pattern a snake leaves in the dirt. Various websites and soothsayers help interpret these events, with rats viewed as a one, water a two, snakes a five (large) or six (small), and anything related to royalty a nine. Many Thais believe that calamity can beget good fortune, and that tragedy may give rise to powerful ghosts who offer guidance on winning numbers. Newspapers report the license plate numbers of cars involved in gruesome accidents. Lottery aficionados note the highway route numbers where accidents took place, tally the casualties, and play the numbers. Nothing is seen as too macabre to be a source of good luck.

See also 
 Gambling in Thailand

References

External links
Government Lottery Office
Society of Thailand
 Lotteries by country
 Gambling in Thailand
Thai Lottery Winers and Tips